Xigang District  may refer to:

 Xigang District, Dalian, Liaoning, People's Republic of China
 Sigang District, alternately Xigang, Tainan, Taiwan